Broughton & Bretton railway station was a station in Bretton, Flintshire, Wales near Broughton, Flintshire. The station was opened on 14 August 1849 and completely closed on 4 May 1964. The station building is now in use as veterinary practice and the east bound platform waiting shelter is still extant.

References

Further reading

Disused railway stations in Flintshire
Railway stations in Great Britain opened in 1849
Railway stations in Great Britain closed in 1962
Former London and North Western Railway stations